Station Tarn is a small fresh-water pond near the west end of Breidnes Peninsula, Vestfold Hills, immediately north of Heidemann Bay in Princess Elizabeth Land in Antarctica. So named by the first ANARE (Australian National Antarctic Research Expeditions) party at Davis Station because of its proximity.

Lakes of Princess Elizabeth Land
Ingrid Christensen Coast